Steve Coleman (born 22 September 1981) is a British Wushu athlete and actor.

Coleman has won the Great Britain National Wushu Championships no less than 7 times, as well as breaking and setting new Great Britain National Wushu records. He is the first competitor from the UK to win medals in the Longfist category (changquan) at the European Championships since Ray Park in 1994. 

Coleman began martial arts at the age of 9 by practising Shotokan Karate. He trained and competed in Karate until the age of 14, earning a junior black belt and winning several competitions in fighting and forms. At 15, he turned his attention to Kung Fu and kickboxing. After a year of finding his direction in martial arts Coleman began training in London in Wushu and Chin Woo (traditional kung fu), later complemented by training in San-Shou (Chinese Kickboxing) and Gymnastics. This took him around the world training and competing in the USA, Europe, Malaysia and China. He won the 2002 Chin Woo World Championships and the Traditional National Wushu Championships in 2001 and 2002.

At 21, he decided to focus strictly on Wushu. Having found himself a personal 1-2-1 coach in Mike Donoghue, former Great Britain Wushu athlete in 1995, Steve went on to win the all-round National Wushu Championships in 2003 and consecutively every year since. This was added to with another World Chin Woo Championship win in 2006, various European Competition wins, and representation of the Great Britain Wushu Team.

Coleman captained the GB Team in 2006 and currently holds national records for Wushu in Great Britain. His first television appearance was on a show called Masters of Combat, aired on BBC2 in 2001. This was later followed up with an appearance in a documentary This is Kung Fu, also shown on BBC2.

In the 2011 film On The Ropes, Coleman appeared alongside Mark Noyce, Ben Shockley and others in a mockumentary style film about martial arts culture in the UK.

References

External links

 

British wushu practitioners
British sanshou practitioners
Living people
1981 births
Place of birth missing (living people)